Cerodrillia perryae is a species of sea snail, a marine gastropod mollusk in the family Drilliidae.

Description
The size of an adult shell varies between 5 mm and 17 mm.

Distribution
This species occurs in the Gulf of Mexico, the Caribbean Sea and the Atlantic Ocean off Brazil at depths between 2 m and 95 m.

References

 Bartsch, Paul, and Harald A. Rehder. "New turritid mollusks from Florida." Proceedings of the United States National Museum (1939).
  Rosenberg, G., F. Moretzsohn, and E. F. García. 2009. Gastropoda (Mollusca) of the Gulf of Mexico, pp. 579–699 in Felder, D.L. and D.K. Camp (eds.), Gulf of Mexico–Origins, Waters, and Biota. Biodiversity. Texas A&M Press, College Station, Texas
 Fallon P.J. (2016). Taxonomic review of tropical western Atlantic shallow water Drilliidae (Mollusca: Gastropoda: Conoidea) including descriptions of 100 new species. Zootaxa. 4090(1): 1–363

External links
 

perryae
Gastropods described in 1939